One Two Three Airlines is an airline headquartered in Shanghai that was launched as a subsidiary of China Eastern Airlines in February 2020. The airline is focused on the Yangtze Delta region.

Name
The name "One Two Three Airlines" refers to Chinese philosopher Laozi's three principles of Daoism.

History
On 26 February 2020, China Eastern Airlines launched OTT Airlines as a subsidiary to operate domestically produced aircraft in addition to its existing business jet operations.

In June 2020, OTT Airlines received the delivery of their first three COMAC ARJ21s. In December 2020, the Civil Aviation Administration of China (CAAC) announced that it had completed a preliminary review of the airline's application for an operating license.

The airline operated its maiden flight on 28 December 2020, a flight from Shanghai Hongqiao International Airport to Beijing Capital International Airport. It plans to open new routes to Nanchang, Hefei, and Wenzhou over the first three months of 2021.

Corporate affairs
OTT Airlines is a subsidiary of China Eastern Airlines. OTT Airlines is headquartered in Shanghai.

Fleet

OTT Airlines mainly operates the Chinese-made Comac ARJ21. It began operations with three ARJ21s, with 6 additionals delivered in 2021 and a total of 35 ARJ21s scheduled to be delivered between 2021 and 2025.

See also
List of airlines of China

References

External links

Airlines of China
Airlines established in 2020
Transport in Shanghai
Companies based in Shanghai
Chinese companies established in 2020
Chinese brands